Robert Brian Strickland (born October 26, 1983) is an American politician who has served in the Georgia State Senate from the 17th district since 2018. He previously served in the Georgia House of Representatives from the 111th district from 2013 to 2017.

References

1983 births
Living people
Republican Party members of the Georgia House of Representatives
Republican Party Georgia (U.S. state) state senators
21st-century American politicians